Aravichy (Orevichi), also known as Ariavichy, is an abandoned Belarusian village in Khoiniki District, Gomel Region.

History
Founded in the 16th Century, in 1959 its population was 923, with 222 families. Following the 1986 nuclear disaster of Chernobyl, it was abandoned and, from 1988, included in the Polesie State Radioecological Reserve; a Belarusian nature reserve that adjoins the Chernobyl Exclusion Zone in Ukraine.

Geography
The village is located by the eastern shore of the Pripyat River, in front of Dzernavichy,  between the cities of Pripyat, in Ukraine, and Naroulia. Other near towns are Hoiniki and Brahin.

See also
Ghost town

References

Populated places in Gomel Region
Kiev Voivodeship
Rechitsky Uyezd
Ghost towns in the Polesie State Radioecological Reserve
Khoiniki District